The team dressage in equestrian at the 1980 Olympic Games in Moscow was held at Trade Unions' Equestrian Complex on 31 July.

Background

Since their historic victory over Germany at the  1972 Olympic Games in Munich, the Soviet dressage riders struggled to regain a leading position and missed a team podium entirely at the 1976 Olympic Games in Montreal. When a boycott of the stronger nations became obvious, the almost 100% chance of recapturing Olympic gold appeared on the horizon for the host nation.

However, to get a team medal, there needed to be more than just a Soviet team in Moscow. As the countries belonging to the political west-block boycotted the Games, the Soviet Union had to stimulate countries from the east-block to take part. Those countries had some international dressage riders, but few really at the Olympic, Grand Prix-level. In the end, Bulgaria, Romania and Poland travelled to Moscow to guarantee a team competition. All this logistic maneuvering to guarantee a nations' ranking led to the fact that Poland, for instance, only found out they were allowed to compete with a team two days before departure.

In Moscow in the end there was a team class, there were three team medals awarded, but to speak of Olympic level is hard when looking at the results these brave riders and horses got from the highly experienced chief judge Gustaf Nyblaeus and his four colleagues. The judges' panel was challenged in its own way with more horses not able to show certain movements than they would have cared for.

The Soviet Union won their coveted team gold in the impressive Bitza stadium about 50 km outside Moscow with more than 800 points ahead of Bulgaria and Romania more than 230 points behind the silver medalists.

Competition format

The team medals were awarded after the Grand-Prix portion of the individual competition.  After the Grand-Prix portion of the individual event the three rides of each team were added up and the highest score was the winner, all three scores counted towards the final.  Both the team and the individual competitions ran concurrently.

Results

References

Equestrian at the 1980 Summer Olympics